Michael "Mickey" Johnson is a former Gaelic footballer who played for the Antrim county team.

Playing career
He represented Antrim at all levels and won an Ulster Under-21 Football Championship Medal in 1989. He also represented Antrim at senior level for 13 years. He retired in 2002 to concentrate on Aussie Rules. He went on to captain the Ireland national Australian rules football team, that won the 2001 Atlantic Alliance Cup and 2002 Australian Football International Cup. He was also selected on the All-Star Team. In 2008, he was selected on the Ireland Masters International Rules Panel in Australia.

References

Year of birth missing (living people)
Living people
Antrim inter-county Gaelic footballers
Gaelic footballers who switched code
Irish players of Australian rules football